Scooby-Doo! and the Witch's Ghost is a 1999 American direct-to-video animated supernatural horror comedy film, and the second of the direct-to-video films based upon Scooby-Doo Saturday morning cartoons. It was produced by Hanna-Barbera Cartoons. The film was released on VHS on October 5, 1999, then on DVD on March 6, 2001.

The plot involves Mystery Inc. travelling to a New England town called Oakhaven (a fictional suburb of Salem, Massachusetts) after being invited by horror writer Ben Ravencroft. Like a number of direct-to-video Scooby-Doo animated films released in the late-1990s and early-2000s, The Witch's Ghost features real supernatural elements instead of the traditionally fabricated ones the franchise is associated with, giving the film a darker tone. The film has been adapted into a book.

It is the second of the first four Scooby-Doo direct-to-video films to be animated overseas by Japanese animation studio Mook Animation. The film marks the first time voice actor and radio-personality Scott Innes voiced Shaggy, as Billy West (who voiced Shaggy in Scooby-Doo on Zombie Island) needed time for his voice work on Futurama. This was also the final film starring Mary Kay Bergman that was released during her lifetime.

Plot
After Ben Ravencroft, a famous horror writer of whom Velma Dinkley is a huge fan, assists her and Mystery Inc. in solving a case at a museum, he invites them to his hometown, Oakhaven, Massachusetts. When they arrive, they find the town converted into a tourist attraction by Mayor Corey, with 17th-century replicas based on the ghost of Sarah Ravencroft, an ancestor of Ben's who was persecuted as a witch and executed by the Puritan townspeople in 1657. Ben disputes this, claiming that Sarah was a Wiccan who used herbal remedies to heal the less fortunate, and he has spent years searching for her medical journal to prove her innocence.

Scooby-Doo and Shaggy Rogers are chased by the ghost of a witch. The gang is drawn to an all-female gothic rock band, The Hex Girls, led by Sally "Thorn" McKnight, during one of their rehearsals. Fred Jones and Daphne Blake follow Thorn and discover her performing a ritual and are convinced the Hex Girls are witches.

The ghost witch is captured by Velma and revealed to be Mr. McKnight, Thorn's father, and Oakhaven's pharmacist, and the townspeople were involved. Thorn explains the "ritual" Fred and Daphne witnessed was an herbal remedy made for soothing her vocal cords and that she is actually 1/16th Wiccan. Corey and Mr. McKnight apologize to Ben for using his ancestor in their publicity stunt, explaining that they created the ghost witch to boost the town's failing tourist economy and that they found inspiration from digging up the head marker for Sarah's grave, though her body was not found. It is revealed that a shoe buckle Scooby had found earlier was actually the lock from Sarah's journal.

Returning to where the lock had been found, Scooby digs and finds a box containing the buried journal, which is actually a spell book. Ben reveals to the horror of everyone that Sarah was, in fact, a witch, who wielded her witchcraft against the townspeople before the Wiccans used their nature-based powers to imprison her within her own spell book; his ancestry, therefore, makes him a warlock. He engineered the mystery at the museum just so he could meet with Mystery Inc., knowing they would be able to help him find the book; the town's fake ghost wasn't part of his plan, though he was able to use it to his advantage. Awakening his warlock powers, Ben releases Sarah but discovers that she has no loyalty to him, and her ambitions are to destroy the world to avenge her imprisonment rather than rule it alongside him.

Disillusioned, Ben attempts to reimprison Sarah, but she tells him that only a Wiccan can defeat her and traps him in a magical sphere. The gang launches an attempt to get the book while Sarah turns pumpkins and trees into monsters and enlarges a turkey in order to stop them. Daphne and Velma free the Hex Girls, and the latter convinces Thorn to use her inherited Wiccan power to reimprison Sarah. The plan works, sucking her back into the book and turning the monsters she created, except for the turkey, back to normal. Refusing to return to her imprisonment alone, Sarah drags Ben into the book with her.

A burning branch then falls onto the book and incinerates it, ensuring that the Ravencrofts can never return. The gang and townsfolk celebrate their deliverance with a concert from the Hex Girls, with the gang and the still giant turkey joining in on the performance.

Voice cast
 Scott Innes as Scooby-Doo and Norville "Shaggy" Rogers
 Frank Welker as Fred Jones
 Mary Kay Bergman as Daphne Blake
 B.J. Ward as Velma Dinkley
 Tim Curry as Ben Ravencroft
 Jennifer Hale as Sally "Thorn" McKnight
 Neil Ross as Mayor Corey and Exhibit Voice
 Jane Wiedlin as Dusk
 Bob Joles as Jack and Dr. Dean
 Kimberly Brooks as Luna
 Tress MacNeille as Sarah Ravencroft
 Peter Renaday as Mr. McKnight

Production
After the success of Scooby-Doo on Zombie Island, which received better sales than Warner Bros. had expected, the team were tasked with creating a second Scooby-Doo direct-to-video film. Its predecessor was considered a one-off experiment and, as such, the crew producing it worked with little oversight from executives. For Witch's Ghost, this creative freedom was scaled back considerably. Warner Bros. suggested screenwriters Rick Copp and David A. Goodman, which insulted the team that had produced the first film in total autonomy. In addition, the studio requested the filmmakers "tone down" their content, as they feared Zombie Island had proved too scary for its intended audience.

Copp and Goodman's script concluded with the revelation that the townspeople were using the witch as a publicity stunt. The original team found this unsatisfactory and Glenn Leopold re-wrote the last third of the film, introducing the concept that the ghost is real.

Soundtrack
To coincide with the release of Scooby-Doo on Zombie Island, Warner Bros. decided to release the album Scooby-Doo's Snack Tracks: The Ultimate Collection. It went on to peak at number 5 on Billboards Kid Albums chart and stayed in the top 25 for over 26-weeks.
 This popularity inspired Warner Bros. to release a full length soundtrack for their next film, Scooby-Doo! and the Witch's Ghost.

Kid Rhino partnered with Warner Home Video and Cartoon Network to release the soundtrack for the film. According to Rhino VP Carol Lee, "We [worked] closely with Warner Home Video so that we're part of everything they do." She added the soundtrack to the film was, "treated like that of a theatrical release. We created a Music Video which appeared on the home video."
On September 14, 1999, the soundtrack was released on CD and Audio Cassette, featuring songs by The Hex Girls, and Billy Ray Cyrus performing "Scooby-Doo, Where Are You?".Notes'''
  From Scooby-Doo on Zombie Island.

Release and receptionScooby-Doo and the Witch's Ghost was released on VHS on October 5, 1999, then on DVD on March 6, 2001. The VHS included the pilot episode for Courage the Cowardly Dog entitled The Chicken From Outer Space shown at the end.

The film earned a 50% approval rating on Rotten Tomatoes.  David Parkinson of Radio Times, gave the film two out of five stars, saying, "This full-length cartoon featuring the ghost-hunting teenage detectives is something of a mixed bag." Joe Neumaier from Entertainment Weekly said, "Though slyly written, it doesn't have the punch of last year's Scooby-Doo on Zombie Island'' – but it's still scarier than The Blair Witch Project."

The film was criticized by religious groups upon its release, who claimed The Hex Girls were "of the Devil, luring young girls into Wicca witchcraft."

Accolades

References

External links

 
 

1999 films
1999 animated films
1999 direct-to-video films
1990s American animated films
1990s monster movies
American comedy horror films
American mystery films
American children's animated comedy films
American children's animated mystery films
1990s English-language films
Films directed by Jim Stenstrum
Films scored by Louis Febre
Films set in Massachusetts
Warner Bros. Animation animated films
Warner Bros. direct-to-video animated films
Scooby-Doo direct-to-video animated films
Films about witchcraft
Hanna-Barbera animated films
Publicity stunts in fiction
American supernatural horror films
Films about Wicca
1990s children's animated films
Films set in New England